Earl Harris is the name of:

 Earl Harris (politician) (1941–2015), Democratic member of the Indiana House of Representatives
 Earl Harris Jr., Democratic member of the Indiana House of Representatives, son of Earl Harris (1941–2015)
 Earl Harris (cricketer) (born 1952), Saint Kitts born former English cricketer